Coleophora aglabitella is a moth of the family Coleophoridae that is endemic to Tunisia.

References

External links

aglabitella
Moths of Africa
Endemic fauna of Tunisia
Moths described in 1915